This is a list of death metal bands (listed by characters !–9 and letters A through K) including bands that have at some stage in their career played within the style of death metal, or one of its sub- or fusion genres; as such there will inevitably be a certain amount of overlap with the list of melodic death metal bands, the list of Swedish death metal bands, and others.

The remaining list can be found at List of death metal bands, L–Z.

List

!–9

 8 Foot Sativa

A

 Abaddon Incarnate
 Abated Mass of Flesh
 Abhorrence
 Ablaze My Sorrow
 Aborted
 Abramelin
 Abscess
 The Absence
 Abysmal Dawn
 Abysmal Torment
 Acheron
 Acid Bath
 Acid Witch
 Act of Denial
 Aeon
 Aeternus
 Afflicted
 The Agonist
 Ahab
 Akercocke
 Alchemist
 Aletheian
 Altar
 The Amenta
 Amon Amarth
 Amoral
 Amorphis
 Anata
 Anathema
 Angelcorpse
 Animosity
 Antestor
 Anvil of Doom
 Die Apokalyptischen Reiter
 Arch Enemy
 Archeon
 Architects
 Archspire
 Arise
 Armageddon
 Armoured Angel
 Arsis
 As I Lay Dying
 Asesino
 Asphyx
 Assück
 At the Gates
 Atheist
 Atrocity
 Atrophia Red Sun
 Austrian Death Machine
 Autokrator
 Autopsy
 Autopsy Torment
 Avulsed
 Axis of Advance

B

 Battlelore
 Becoming the Archetype
 Beheaded
 Behemoth
 Behold… The Arctopus
 Belphegor
 Benea Reach
 Beneath the Massacre
 Benediction
 Benighted
 The Berzerker
 Bestial Warlust
 Between the Buried and Me
 Beyond the Sixth Seal
 Bilocate
 The Black Dahlia Murder
 Blinded Colony
 Blo.Torch
 Blotted Science
 Blood Duster
 Blood Feast
 Blood Red Throne
 Blood Stain Child
 Bloodbath
 Bolt Thrower
 Born of Osiris
 Brain Drill
 Brodequin
 Broken Hope
 Brujeria
 Brutal Truth
 By Night

C

 Cadacross
 Cadaver
 Callenish Circle
 Cancer
 Caninus
 Cannibal Corpse
 Capharnaum
 Carbonized
 Carcass
 Cardinal Sin
 Carnage
 Carnival in Coal
 Cattle Decapitation
 Cavalera Conspiracy
 Celtic Frost
 Cemetary
 Cenotaph
 Centinex
 Cephalic Carnage
 Ceremonial Oath
 Chain Collector
 Changer
 The Chasm
 Children of Bodom
 Circle of Dead Children
 Coldworker
 Comecon
 The Concubine
 Consolation
 Coprofago
 Corpus Mortale
 The County Medical Examiners
 Cradle of Filth
 Criminal
 The Crimson Armada
 Crimson Death
 Crimson Thorn
 Crionics
 The Crown
 Cryogenic
 Crypta
 Cryptic Shift
 Cryptopsy
 Cynic

D

 Dååth
 Damaged
 Dance Club Massacre
 Dark Age
 Dark Heresy
 Dark Lunacy
 Dark Tranquillity
 Darkest Hour
 Darkthrone
 Dawn of Azazel
 Daylight Dies
 Dead Horse
 Dead Infection
 Deadlock
 Death
 Death Breath
 Death Organ
 Death Requisite
 Deathbound
 Deathchain
 Debauchery
 Decadence
 Decapitated
 Deceased
 Decrepit Birth
 Deeds of Flesh
 Defeated Sanity
 Defecation
 Defleshed
 Deicide
 Demigod
 Demilich
 Demiricous
 Demonic Resurrection
 Demonoid
 Desecration
 Despised Icon
 Despite
 Destroy Destroy Destroy

 Desultory
 Dethklok
 Detonation
 Deuteronomium
 Devian
 DevilDriver
 Devilish Impressions
 Devolved
 Devourment
 Diablo
 Diabolic
 Dies Irae
 A Different Breed of Killer
 Dim Mak
 Dimension Zero
 Disarmonia Mundi
 Disavowed
 Disbelief
 Disembowelment
 Disentomb
 Disgorge
 Disharmonic Orchestra
 Disillusion
 Disincarnate
 Disinterment
 Diskreet
 Dismember
 Diocletian
 Dispatched
 Dissection
 Distorted
 Divine Heresy
 Dominus
 Dr. Shrinker
 Dragged into Sunlight
 Drottnar
 The Duskfall
 Dying Fetus

E

 Ebony Tears
 Edge of Sanity
 Elysia
 Elysium
 Embalmer
 Embodyment
 Ensiferum
 Entombed
 Epoch of Unlight
 Esoteric
 Eternal Lord
 Eternal Oath
 Eternal Tears of Sorrow
 Eucharist
 Evoken
 Ex Deo
 Exhumed
 Expulsion
 Extol
 Extreme Noise Terror

F
 
 Face Down
 The Faceless
 Falchion
 Farmakon
 Fear Factory
 Fear My Thoughts
 Festerday
 Fission
 Fleshcrawl
 Fleshgod Apocalypse
 Fragments of Unbecoming
 From a Second Story Window
 From the Shallows
 Frontside
 The Funeral Pyre

G

 Gandalf
 Gates of Ishtar
 The Gathering
 Gehenna
 General Surgery
 Ghost Brigade
 Ghoul
 Glass Casket
 Goatlord
 Goatwhore
 God Dethroned
 God Forbid
 God Macabre
 Godgory
 Gojira
 Gone Postal
 Goreaphobia
 Gorefest
 Gorelord
 Gorerotted
 Gorguts
 Gory Blister
 Grave
 Graves of Valor
 Grenouer
 Grief of War
 Grotesque
 Gut
 Gutworm

H

 Hacride
 Haemorrhage
 Haggard
 Hate
 Hate Eternal
 Hatebeak
 Hatesphere
 The Haunted
 Hearse
 Heaven Shall Burn
 Hecate Enthroned
 Hellhammer
 Helltrain
 Hibernus Mortis
 Hollenthon
 Hooded Menace
 Horrendous
 Human
 Human Remains
 Hybrid
 Hypocrisy

I

 Illdisposed
 Immolation
 Immortal Souls
 Impaled
 Impaled Nazarene
 Impending Doom
 Imperial Triumphant
 Impetigo
  Impious
 In Battle
 In Flames
 In Mourning
 In-Quest
 Incantation
 Inevitable End
 Infernäl Mäjesty
 Ingested
 Inhumate
 Inhume
 Iniquity
 Insision
 Insomnium
 Into Eternity
 Into the Moat

J

 Job for a Cowboy
 Jungle Rot

K

 Kaamos
 Kalmah
 Kataklysm
 Katalepsy
 Katatonia
 Kekal
 Killing Addiction
 Knights of the Abyss
 Konkhra
 Krabathor
 Krisiun
 Kronos

See also

 List of melodic death metal bands
 List of heavy metal bands
 List of grindcore bands
 List of mathcore bands
 List of deathcore bands
 List of hardcore punk bands

References

Lists of death metal bands

es:Anexo:Bandas de death metal
ms:Senarai band death metal
pt:Anexo:Lista de bandas de death metal
ro:Listă de formații death metal
ru:Список исполнителей дэт-метала
fi:Luettelo death metal -yhtyeistä